Canoeing  has been featured as competition sports in the Summer Olympic Games since the 1936 Games in Berlin, although they were demonstration sports at the  1924 Games in Paris.  There are two disciplines of canoeing in Olympic competition: slalom and sprint.

Two styles of boats are used in this sport: canoes with 1 or 2 canoers and kayaks with 1, 2 or 4 kayakers.  This leads to the name designation of each event.  For example, "C-1" is a canoe singles event and "K-2" is a kayak doubles event.  Races are usually 500 metres or 1000 metres long, although there were also 10 km events from 1936 to 1956. On 13 August 2009, it was announced by the International Canoe Federation that the men's 500 m events would be replaced at the 2012 Summer Olympics by 200 m events with one of them being K-1 200 m for the women. The other events for men at 200 m will be C-1, K-1, and K-2. This was confirmed at their 2009 Board of Directors meeting in Windsor, Berkshire, Great Britain on 5 December 2009.

Summary

Canoe sprint

Events

Medal table
Source:
Last updated after the 2020 Summer Olympics and after silver and bronze medals reallocation in 2021 in London 2012 Men's C-1 200 metres event.

Canoe slalom

Events

Medal table
Source:
Last updated after the 2020 Summer Olympics

Overall medal table

Updated after the 2020 Summer Olympics and after silver and bronze medals reallocation in 2021 in London 2012 Men's C-1 200 metres event.

Nations

See also
 List of Olympic venues in canoeing

References

 
Olympics
Canoeing